Edward Francis Murray (May 8, 1895 – November 8, 1970), born in Mystic, Connecticut, was an American Major League Baseball shortstop who played in one game for the St. Louis Browns on June 24, . He struck out in his only at bat.

Murray stood only 5 feet and 6 inches tall, yet he was known for his power during his brief time in the MLB.

Murray died in Cheyenne, Wyoming on November 8, 1970.

External links
Baseball Reference.com

References

1895 births
1970 deaths
St. Louis Browns players
Baseball players from Connecticut
People from Mystic, Connecticut